"Go On Girl" is a song written by Ne-Yo, Tor Erik Hermansen, Mikkel S. Eriksen, Espen Lind and Amund Bjørklund, for Ne-Yo's second studio album Because of You. It was released to radio as the fourth single on December 4, 2007. It peaked at number 27 on the Billboard Hot R&B/Hip-Hop Songs, giving Ne-Yo his tenth top forty hit on the chart. Also, to date, it has peaked at number 96 on the Billboard Hot 100.

New York rapper Papoose, freestyled over this song in memory of Sean Bell entitled, "We Shall Overcome".

Track listing
US CD single
 "Go On Girl" (Radio version)
 "Go On Girl" (Instrumental)

Music video
The video was shot entirely in black and white (except for the model's yellow sash) and was directed by Hype Williams and costume designed by June Ambrose and premiered on MTV Jams. The song's music video features Jade Cole from America's Next Top Model Cycle 6.

Charts

Weekly charts

Year-end charts

References

External links
 

2007 songs
2008 singles
Music videos directed by Hype Williams
Ne-Yo songs
Song recordings produced by Stargate (record producers)
Def Jam Recordings singles
Pop ballads
Contemporary R&B ballads
Songs written by Espen Lind
Songs written by Amund Bjørklund
Songs written by Ne-Yo
Songs written by Tor Erik Hermansen
Songs written by Mikkel Storleer Eriksen
2000s ballads